Tantaliana is a genus of moths in the family Eupterotidae.

Species
 Tantaliana crepax (Wallengren, 1860)
 Tantaliana nigristriata (Janse, 1915)
 Tantaliana signifera (Walker, 1855)
 Tantaliana tantalus (Herrich-Schäffer, 1854)

References

Janinae
Moth genera